The Battle of Bron yr Erw was a battle fought at Clynnog Fawr, Wales, in 1075.

In 1075 the battle of Bron-yr-erw took place between Gruffydd ap Cynan and Trahaearn ap Caradog.
Source: Thomas Jones, The Chronicle of the Princes, 1955, p.29.
Gruffydd ap Cynan fought a battle at Bron yr Erw, near Clynnog, in 1075, which turned out disastrously for him and drove him back as an exile to Ireland, the land of his birth.
Source: Cambridge County Histories: Carnarvonshire, 1911; p. 89.
The battle is mentioned in J.E.Lloyd, A History of Wales, vol II, 1912, pp. 380 & 383.
B.A.Malaws, RCAHMW, 23 May 2006.

References

Sources 
 

Bron yr Erw
Bron yr Erw
11th century in Wales
1075 in Europe